Nepal legalised abortion in March 2002, under the 11th Amendment to the Civil Code. The legal services were successfully implemented on December 25, 2003. The high maternal mortality rates in Nepal lead to the government legalising it. More than 500,000 women sought abortion between 2004–2014. In 2014, 323,100 women in Nepal had the abortion; among this, only 42% of abortions were legal and 19% were treated for abortion complications. Similar study had found the rate of unintended pregnancy as 50%.

Methods for abortion 
According to the services provided by the government, women are allowed to choose between manual vacuum aspiration (MVA) and medical abortion (MA) abortion procedures.

Manual vacuum aspiration: It is a moderately invasive procedure where cervical dilators are used and suction is applied to remove the pregnancy from the uterus.

Medical abortion: Medical abortion is a method most often combining a series of two types of oral pills taken to terminate the pregnancy. The experience is similar to a miscarriage and many patients feel it is a less invasive option.

Abortion law in Nepal 
Prior to 2002, Nepal had strict anti-abortion laws which ensured not only the imprisonment of the pregnant women who seek abortion but also their family members. In fact about 20% of women prisoners were imprisoned for abortion-related choices.

According to the law, women had access to legal abortion only under the following conditions

·        The pregnancy must be under 12 weeks of gestation. If the woman is above 16 years of age, she does not require the permission of her husband or her guardian.

·        In the case of rape or incest, the pregnancy must be under 18 weeks of gestation.

·        If recommended by the doctor, at any stage of the pregnancy if it poses danger to the physical or mental health of the pregnant woman or if the fetus suffers from severe physical deformity.

References

Nepal
Women in Nepal
Women's rights in Nepal